Baltic Handball League is a handball league, where participate the strongest clubs from Baltic states. The league is organized by Baltic Handball Association. The league is established in the beginning of 1990s.

Participated clubs
Participated clubs (as of 2020):
Põlva Serviti
ZRHK Tenax Dobele 
VHC Šviesa 
Celtnieks Rīga 
Dragūnas Klaipėda 
HC Kehra / Horizon Pulp & Paper
Viljandi HC
Varsa-Stronglasas Alytus 
Granitas Kaunas 	
SK Tapa / N.R. Energy
SK Latgols Ludza
HK Ogre.

Winners
 1991 Granitas Kaunas
 1992 Granitas Kaunas
 1993 SKA Minsk
 1994 Granitas Kaunas
 1995 Granitas Kaunas
 1996 Granitas Kaunas
 1997 SKA Minsk
 1998 SKA Minsk
 1999 SKA Minsk
 2000 SKA Minsk
 2001 SKA Minsk
 2002 HK ASK Riga
 2003 HK ASK Riga
 2004 HK ASK Riga
 2005 GK Newa St. Petersburg
 2006 HC Kehra
 2007 HK ASK Riga
 2008 Põlva Serviti
 2009 HC Dinamo Minsk
 2010 Põlva Serviti
 2011 HC Kehra
 2012 HC Kehra
 2013 SKA Minsk
 2014 SKA Minsk
 2015 SKA Minsk
 2016 Riihimaen Cocks
 2017 Riihimaen Cocks
 2018 Riihimaen Cocks
 2019 Riihimaen Cocks
 2020 postponed
2021 HC Dragūnas Klaipėda

References

External links
 

Handball competitions in Europe
Sport in the Baltic states
Handball leagues in Lithuania
Multi-national professional sports leagues